Hurricane Wilma was an extremely intense and destructive Atlantic hurricane which was the most intense storm of its kind and the second-most intense tropical cyclone recorded in the Western Hemisphere, after Hurricane Patricia in 2015. Part of the record-breaking 2005 Atlantic hurricane season, which included three of the ten most intense Atlantic hurricanes in terms of barometric pressure (along with #4 Rita and #7 Katrina), Wilma was the twenty-second storm, thirteenth hurricane, sixth major hurricane, fourth Category 5 hurricane, and the second-most destructive hurricane of the 2005 season. Its origins came from a tropical depression that formed in the Caribbean Sea near Jamaica on October 15, headed westward, and intensified into a tropical storm two days later, which abruptly turned southward and was named Wilma. Wilma continued to strengthen, and eventually became a hurricane on October 18.

Wilma's intensity slowly leveled off after becoming a Category 5 hurricane, and winds had decreased to  before it reached the Yucatán Peninsula on October 20 and 21. After crossing the Yucatán, Wilma emerged into the Gulf of Mexico as a Category 2 hurricane. As it began accelerating to the northeast, gradual re-intensification occurred, and the hurricane was upgraded to Category 3 status on October 24. As Wilma was crossing Florida, it briefly weakened back to a Category 2 hurricane, but again re-intensified as it reached the Atlantic Ocean. The hurricane intensified into a Category 3 hurricane for the last time, before weakening while accelerating northeastward. By October 26, Wilma transitioned into an extratropical cyclone southeast of Nova Scotia.

Wilma made several landfalls, with the most destructive effects felt in the Yucatán Peninsula of Mexico, Cuba, and the U.S. state of Florida. At least 52 deaths were reported and damage totaled to $22.4 billion, most of which occurred in the United States. After Wilma, no major hurricane made landfall in the contiguous United States until Hurricane Harvey made landfall in southern Texas on August 26, 2017, ending a record period of 11 years and 10 months. During this time, major Atlantic hurricanes occurred slightly more frequently than average; they just either did not make landfall at that strength in the United States or just missed the United States entirely. Also, after Wilma, no hurricane struck the state of Florida until Hurricane Hermine did so nearly 11 years later in 2016, and no major hurricane struck Florida until nearly 12 years later when Hurricane Irma made landfall in early September 2017.

Meteorological history

During mid-October 2005, a large monsoon-like system developed in the Caribbean Sea. A broad low pressure area formed on October 13 to the southeast of Jamaica, which slowly became more defined. The depression drifted southwestward through a favorable environment, including warm sea surface temperatures. The depression strengthened into a tropical storm on October 17, whereupon the NHC designated it Wilma. Initial intensification was slow, due to Wilma's large size and a flat pressure gradient, although the associated convection gradually organized.

On October 18, Wilma intensified into a hurricane, and subsequently underwent explosive deepening over the open waters of the Caribbean Sea. An eyewall replacement cycle caused Wilma to weaken below Category 5 status on October 20, as it drifted northwestward toward Mexico's Yucatán Peninsula. About six hours later, Wilma made a second landfall on the Mexican mainland near Puerto Morelos.

The hurricane weakened over land, but re-intensified once it reached the Gulf of Mexico. Wilma accelerated to the northeast, steered by a powerful trough. Wilma rapidly crossed the state and weakened, emerging into the Atlantic Ocean near Jupiter, Florida. The hurricane briefly re-intensified while passing north of the Bahamas, absorbing the smaller Tropical Storm Alpha to the east. The hurricane passed west of Bermuda on October 25. After cold air and wind shear penetrated the core of convection, Wilma transitioned into an extratropical cyclone on October 26 to the south of Nova Scotia before it was absorbed by another extratropical storm a day later over Atlantic Canada.

Records
This is the lowest central pressure on record for any Atlantic hurricane, breaking the previous record of  set by Hurricane Gilbert in 1988.

While striking Mexico, it dropped torrential rainfall on the offshore Isla Mujeres. Over 24 hours, a rain gauge recorded  of precipitation, which set a record in Mexico for the nation's highest 24–hour rainfall total, as well as the highest 24 hour rainfall total in the western hemisphere.

When Tropical Storm Wilma formed on October 17, it became the first named "W" storm in the basin since naming began in 1950. Wilma remained the only W-named storm until Tropical Storm Wilfred in 2020, later followed by Tropical Storm Wanda in the next season.

Preparations

The various governments of the nations threatened by Wilma issued many tropical cyclone warnings and watches. At 09:00 UTC on October 16, a hurricane watch and tropical storm warning were posted for the Cayman Islands; these were dropped three days later. A tropical storm warning was issued in Honduras from the border with Nicaragua westward to Cabo Camaron at 15:00 UTC on October 17. In Belize, another tropical storm warning became in effect at 15:00 UTC on October 19 from the border with Mexico to Belize City. On October 21, the tropical storm warning in Honduras was discontinued at 03:00 UTC, while the other in Belize was canceled twelve hours later.

The Mexican government issued hurricane warnings from Chetumal near Belize to San Felipe, Yucatán; a tropical storm warning was extended westward to Celestún. Officials declared a state of emergency in 23 municipalities across the Yucatán, and placed Quintana Roo and Yucatán under a red alert, the highest on its color-coded alert system. About 75,000 people evacuated in northeastern Mexico, including about 45,000 people who rode out the storm in 200 emergency shelters, many of them tourists. Schools were canceled in Quintana Roo, Yucatán, and Campeche, up to 15 days in some areas. Los Premios MTV Latinoamérica – the MTV Video Music Awards Latinoamérica – were canceled due to the hurricane, originally scheduled to occur in Playa del Carmen on October 20.

The Cuban government issued several watches and warnings in relation to Wilma. By October 22, a hurricane warning was in place for the city of Havana, as well as the provinces of La Habana and Pinar del Río. A tropical storm warning was also issued for Isla de la Juventud, and a hurricane watch was issued for Matanzas Province. The Cuban government mobilized 93,154 workers to help evacuate 760,168 people across western of the island's western provinces. The evacuees generally stayed with family, friends, or in storm shelters. Officials closed all schools nationwide during the passage of Wilma and later Tropical Storm Alpha. During Wilma's passage, 41 hotels closed, of which five remained closed for two weeks after the storm. Many businesses, banks, and government institutions were closed for several days due to the storm. Along the coast, 554 boats were moved to protect them during the storm. Farmers moved 246,631 livestock, more than half of them cattle, to avoid the expected high waters. Passenger travel was halted for all trains nationwide, as well as ferry service between Batabanó and Isla de la Juventud. Poor weather conditions forced three airports to briefly close – José Martí International in Havana, Juan Gualberto Gómez in Varadero and Jardines del Rey in Cayo Coco.

The NHC issued tropical cyclone warnings and watches across much of southern Florida, with a hurricane warning ultimately covering all of South Florida from Longboat Key on the west coast to Titusville, including Lake Okeechobee and the Florida Keys. A tropical storm watch extended northward on the west coast to Steinhatchee River. On Florida's east coast, a tropical storm warning stretched northward from Titusville to St. Augustine, with a tropical storm watch extending north to Fernandina Beach. Florida governor Jeb Bush declared a state of emergency on October 19, allowing the deployment of the Florida National Guard and strategic placement of emergency supplies. A mandatory evacuation of residents was ordered for the Florida Keys in Monroe County and those in Collier County living west or south of U.S. Route 41. County offices, schools and courts were closed October 24. At least 400 Florida Keys evacuated stayed at the Monroe County shelter at Florida International University in Miami-Dade County. All Collier County public schools closed on October 21 and remained closed on October 24, as the hurricane made landfall. Schools around Fort Myers and Tampa, as well as Sumter, Marion, Osceola, Pasco, and Polk counties, were closed on October 24. In other areas of Central Florida, schools were closed in Flagler, Lake, Orange, and Volusia counties. Schools in Broward and Palm Beach counties were closed for two weeks because of extended power outages and some damage to school buildings.

Wilma's passage through Florida disrupted many festival and sporting matches. Key West postponed Fantasy Fest, often held annually around Halloween, until December, resulting in only about one-third of the usual attendance figures and a loss of millions of dollars in revenue for hotels, restaurants, and stores. The NFL moved the Kansas City Chiefs vs. Miami Dolphins game at Dolphins Stadium from October 23 to October 21, while the NHL postponed the Florida Panthers vs. Ottawa Senators match at the BankAtlantic Center from October 22 to December 5. The NCAA rescheduled three college football games originally set to occur on October 22, with the Georgia Tech vs. Miami match moved to November 19, the West Virginia vs. South Florida game moved to December 3, and the Central Florida vs. Tulane game played on October 21, one day earlier.

The government of The Bahamas issued a hurricane warning for the northwestern Bahamas at 12:00 UTC on October 23, about 24 hours before Wilma made its closest approach to the archipelago. Officials ordered evacuations for the eastern and western portion of Grand Bahama island, with an estimated 300–1,000 people who ultimately evacuated. The hurricane halted production of Disney's Pirates of the Caribbean: Dead Man's Chest, forcing the cast and crew to evacuate.

The Bermuda Weather Service issued a gale warning for the island early on October 24, due to uncertainty whether Wilma would be tropical or not. After consulting with the NHC, the agency maintained the gale warning rather than changing it to a tropical storm warning to reduce confusion.

Impact

Caribbean
For several days in its formative stages, Wilma's outer rainbands dropped heavy rainfall in Haiti and as far east as the Dominican Republic. The rains triggered river flooding and landslides in Haiti, killing 12 people, and forcing 300 residents into shelters. The storm cut communications between Les Cayes and Tiburon. Less than a week after Wilma formed, Tropical Storm Alpha struck Hispaniola and caused additional deadly floods in Haiti. Damage in the country totaled around $500,000.

Wilma caused one death in Jamaica as a tropical depression on October 16. It pounded the island for three days ending on October 18, flooding several low-lying communities and triggering mudslides that blocked roads and damaged several homes. Almost 250 people were in emergency shelters on the island. Damage on the island totaled $93.5 million.

While Wilma was moving northeast in the Gulf of Mexico, the hurricane produced high tides and gusty winds across western Cuba. The Cuban government tabulated the hurricane's economic cost at US$704.2 million, which included the expenses for preparations and lost production from factories. Nationwide, Wilma destroyed 446 houses and damaged another 7,149 to varying degree, mostly roofing damage. Due to high floodwaters, nearly 250 people required rescue from their homes in Havana, using inflatable rafts and amphibious vehicles to reach the most severely flooded areas. The hurricane wrecked  worth of agriculture products in Pinar del Río and Havana provinces, which included damaged fruit trees, bee colonies, and tobacco houses. High floodwaters inundated parts of Havana and along Cuba's northwest coast, damaging roads and rail lines. Landslides blocked two bridges and five roads in eastern Cuba. The hurricane also damaged 364 schools and three hospitals. Officials cut electricity in Havana after winds reached ; after the storm, there were power and water outages in the city, nearby neighborhoods, and in Pinar del Río province. The storm downed 146 power poles and  worth of electric lines.

Mexico

Across the Yucatán peninsula, Hurricane Wilma dropped torrential rainfall, inundated coastlines with a significant storm surge, and produced an extended period of strong winds. The hurricane lashed parts of the Yucatán peninsula with hurricane-force winds gusts for nearly 50 hours. The gust in Cancún was the strongest ever recorded in Mexico. The prolonged period of high waves eroded beaches and damaged coastal reefs.

Across Mexico, Wilma killed eight people – seven in Quintana Roo, and one in Yucatán. Throughout Mexico, Wilma's damage was estimated at $4.8 billion (MXN, US$454 million), mostly in Quintana Roo, where it was the state's costliest natural disaster. The hurricane resulted in $13.9 billion (US$1.3 billion) in lost economic output and earnings, 95% of which was related to lost tourism revenue. Wilma damaged 28,980 houses in Mexico, and destroyed or severely damaged 110 hotels in Cancún alone. In the city, about 300,000 people were left homeless. The water level in Cancún reached the third story of some buildings due to  waves, in addition to the storm surge. About 300 people who were from Great Britain had to be evacuated when their shelter flooded in Cancún, while the Americans were left there by the United States. The hurricane also caused significant damage in Cozumel and Isla Mujeres. About 300,000 people lost power in Mexico. The storm also damaged 473 schools.

Flooding damaged houses in low-lying areas of eastern Yucatán state. The primary highway connecting Cancún and Mérida, Yucatán was impassible after the storm due to floods. Across Mexico, Wilma damaged  worth of crops, majority of which was in Yucatán state.

United States

Florida

Collier County measured the highest storm surge on the mainland, reaching . Wilma also spawned 12 tornadoes in Florida.

Wind damage accounted for much of the storm's overall damage. The very large eye of Wilma moved across all of or portions of six counties – Broward, Collier, Hendry, Miami-Dade, and Palm Beach. This resulted in widespread hurricane-force sustained winds and gusts, with Category 2 conditions likely occurring in southeastern Florida from Palm Beach County to northern Miami-Dade County. Strong winds left widespread power outages; Florida Power & Light reported more than 3,241,000 customers had lost power. At the time, this represented the largest power failure in the history of Florida. The outages affected approximately 2.5 million subscribers in the Miami metropolitan area – roughly 98% of electrical customers in that area. Florida's agricultural industry reported around $1.3 billion in damage. Nurseries and sugarcane crops were particularly hard hit – the former suffered damage totaling nearly $554 million and the latter experienced damages around $400 million. Overall, Wilma left about $19 billion in damage and 30 deaths in Florida, 5 from direct causes.

In Monroe County, storm surge from Wilma impacted the Florida Keys twice, with the second event causing the worst coastal flooding in the island chain since Hurricane Betsy in 1965. At Dry Tortugas National Park, storm surge and winds damaged boats, destroyed docking facilities, and flooded the park office and livings quarters, but Fort Jefferson saw no major damage. Water submerged roughly 60% of Key West and left approximately 690 apartment units, homes, and mobile homes uninhabitable. Wilma damaged more than 4,100 single-family residences, 20 of which sustained major damage, and 6 experienced complete destruction. The hurricane also damaged roughly 2,500 mobile homes, with 257 suffering substantial impact and 15 being destroyed. About 90 apartment and condominium units received some degree of impact. As many as 20,000 cars suffered damage, prompting the Key West Citizen to refer to the lower Florida Keys as a "car graveyard." The storm ran hundreds of vessels aground, including 223 boats between Key West and Islamorada. Damage in Monroe County reached at least $200 million, with approximately half the total occurring in Key West, though the figure did not include incorporated areas.

Storm surge in Collier County mostly impacted Chokoloskee, Everglades City, and Plantation Island. The hurricane also caused major impact in Naples, especially to 90 high-rise condos. Buildings in the city suffered $150 million in damage. Additionally, high winds severely damaged 100 hangars at Naples Airport. Wilma damaged 16,000 businesses and homes to some degree in Collier County, with 394 buildings suffering damage to at least 50 percent of their structure. The hurricane destroyed 2 dwellings, 8 workplaces, and 615 mobile homes, about one-third in Immokalee. In total, the county reported $1.2 billion in damage, along with a death toll of 7. Hurricane-force wind gusts extended northward into Lee County. Bonita Springs experienced the worst impact in Lee County, with 972 homes reporting minor to major damage. In Cape Coral, Wilma impacted 511 residences; 490 dwellings suffered minor damage, 20 others experienced extensive damage, and 1 mobile home was destroyed. The storm also inflicted moderate to major damage to 78 businesses and demolished 1 other workplace. Insured and uninsured damage in the county totaled $101 million and one fatality occurred.

Wilma inflicted a multi-billion dollar disaster in the Miami metropolitan area, including $2.9 billion in damage in Palm Beach County, $2 billion in Miami-Dade County, and $1.2 billion in Broward County. Numerous homes and businesses experienced some degree of impact, with over 55,000 dwellings and 3,600 workplaces damaged in Palm Beach County alone. Furthermore, officials declared 5,111 residences in Broward County and at least 2,059 others in Miami-Dade County as uninhabitable. An aerial survey in Broward County indicated that 70% of homes and businesses in Coconut Creek, Davie, Margate, North Lauderdale, Plantation, and Sunrise experienced some degree of impact. High winds also damaged skyscrapers and high-rises, including the Colonial Bank Building, the JW Marriott Miami, Espirito Santo Plaza, and the Four Seasons Hotel Miami in Greater Downtown Miami, as well as the One Financial Plaza, AutoNation Tower, Broward Financial Center, the Broward County Administration Building, the 14-floor Broward County School Board building, and the Broward County Courthouse in Fort Lauderdale.

In Hendry County, high winds damaged around 90 percent of buildings and homes in Clewiston and other eastern sections of the county. The county suffered a loss of about half of orange and sugar crops. Overall, Wilma substantially damaged 250 homes and destroyed 550 other homes in Hendry County. Damage totaled at least $567 million, with $300 million to agriculture and $267 million in structures. Hurricane-force wind gusts in Glades County left approximately 3,000 people without electricity. Wilma destroyed more than 60 homes. Seventeen school district buildings suffered roof damage. Approximately 800 residences sustained damage in Okeechobee County, with 114 receiving major damage and 29 others being destroyed. The county tallied $95.7 million in damage. Neighboring St. Lucie County reported damage totaling $43.4 million. Six tornadoes in the county also damaged or destroyed some apartments, cars, fences, power lines, restaurants, and trees. In the Florida Panhandle, abnormal high tides generated by Wilma washed the Cape St. George Lighthouse into the Gulf of Mexico. Damage elsewhere in the state was generally minor.

Other states
Rainfall from Hurricane Wilma extended up the east coast of the United States from Florida to Virginia. Precipitation reached  along the Outer Banks of North Carolina. As Wilma was moving out to sea, a nor'easter developed near Cape Hatteras; the two systems produced high waves, coastal flooding, and beach erosion from Delaware to Maine, resulting in some road closures. The nor'easter drew moisture and energy from Wilma to produce heavy rainfall, snowfall in higher elevations, and gusty winds, with a peak wind gust of  recorded at Blue Hill Meteorological Observatory in Milton. The high winds resulting in downed trees and scattered power outages, with traffic blocked on parts of Interstate 95 in Rhode Island and the Green Line train in Newton, Massachusetts. Snowfall reached  in Vermont. In Maine, the snowfall left about 25,000 people without power.

Bahamas and Bermuda

After exiting Florida, Wilma passed just north of the northwestern Bahamas. The sudden rush of water destroyed about 250 homes and damaged another 400, mostly on the western portion of Grand Bahama. At one home in Eight Mile Rock, the waters swept away and killed a 15-month-old infant. The flooding unearthed 54 bodies from five cemeteries. Central and eastern Grand Bahama received little to no damage from the hurricane. The undersecretary to the prime minister, Carnard Bethell, estimated monetary damage at "just maybe under $100 million". However, the country estimated a damage total of about US$6.5 million in their report to the WMO. Damage in the Bahamas mostly consisted of torn roofs and uprooted trees.

The strongest winds on the island were short-lived due to the hurricane's fast forward motion at the time. The hurricane disrupted the flight path of migratory birds, resulting in an unusual increase in frigatebird sightings around the island.

Aftermath

Due to the hurricanes' widespread damage, the World Meteorological Organization retired the name "Wilma" in April 2006, at the 28th session of the regional hurricane committee. The name was replaced with "Whitney" on the naming list for the 2011 season.

Mexico
In Mexico, residents and tourists staying in shelters faced food shortages in Wilma's immediate aftermath. There were 10 community kitchens set up across Cancún, each capable of feeding 1,500 people every day. Local and federal troops quelled looting and rioting in Cancún. While Cancún's airport was closed to the public, stranded visitors filled taxis and buses to Mérida, Yucatán. Located  from Cancún, Mérida was the region's closest functioning airport. Most hotels in Cozumel, Isla Mujeres, and the Riviera Maya were largely reopened by early January 2006. The resorts in Cancún took longer to reopen, but most were operational by Wilma's one-year anniversary.

On November 28, Mexico declared a disaster area for 9 of Quintana Roo's 11 municipalities – Benito Juárez, Cozumel, Felipe Carrillo Puerto, Isla Mujeres, Lázaro Cárdenas, Othon P. Blanco, and Solidaridad. Mexico's development bank – Nacional Financiera – provided financial assistance for businesses affected by Wilma and Stan through a $400 million fund (MXN, US$38 million). Quintana Roo's state government began a temporary work program for residents whose jobs were impacted by the hurricane. The Mexican Red Cross provided food, water, and health care to residents affected by the hurricane. The agency also distributed emergency supplies, such as mosquito nets, plastic sheeting, and hygiene supplies.

Cuba
Within a few days of Wilma's passage by Cuba, workers restored power and water access to impacted residents. The Revolutionary Armed Forces cleared and repaired roads around Havana that were flooded. The capital city was reopened and largely returned to normal within six days of the storm. On October 25, the government of the United States offered emergency assistance to Cuba, which the Cuban government accepted a day later. This acceptance of aid broke from previous practice; many times in the past, including during Hurricane Dennis, the United States offered aid, but the Cuban government declined. The United States provided US$100,000 to non-governmental organizations in the country.

United States
On October 24, 2005, the same day Wilma made landfall in Florida, President George W. Bush approved a disaster declaration for Brevard, Broward, Collier, Glades, Hendry, Indian River, Lee, Martin, Miami-Dade, Monroe, Okeechobee, Palm Beach, and St. Lucie counties. The Federal Emergency Management Agency (FEMA) expended $342.5 million to the 227,321 approved applicants. The agency paid out $150.8 million for housing and $191.5 million for other significant disaster-related needs, including loss of personal property, moving and storage, and medical or funeral expenses relating to the hurricane. Additionally, public assistance from FEMA totaled over $1.4 billion and grants for hazard mitigation projects exceeded $141.5 million.

Florida governor Jeb Bush activated an emergency bridge loan program in early November 2005, allowing small businesses damaged by Wilma to apply for interest-free loans up to $25,000. The Florida legislature took several actions in the 2006 session in relation to Wilma. These included allocating $66.7 million to improving shelters, mandating that high-rise buildings have at least one elevator capable of operating by generator, and requiring gas stations and convenience stores to possess a back-up electrical supply in the event that they have fuel but no power.

Florida's sugar industry was greatly affected; the cropping had already started and had to be halted indefinitely. Damage to sugarcane crops was critical and widespread. Citrus canker spread rapidly throughout southern Florida following Hurricane Wilma, creating further hardships on an already stressed citrus economy due to damage from Wilma and previous years' hurricanes. Citrus production estimates fell to a low of 158 million boxes for the 2005–2006 production seasons from a high of 240 million for 2003–2004. Forecasts projected a decrease of 28 million boxes of oranges, the smallest crop since the 1989-1990 growing season, caused by a severe freeze.

By late-September 2010, roughly $9.2 billion had been paid for more than 1 million insurance claims that had been filed throughout Florida in relation to Hurricane Wilma.

After Wilma, the United States would not be struck by another major hurricane until Hurricane Harvey made landfall in southern Texas on August 26, 2017, ending a record period of 11 years and 10 months, a total of 4,323 days. During this time, major hurricanes occurred in the Atlantic slightly more frequently than average; they just did not make landfall in the United States. Additionally, Florida would not be struck by another hurricane for a record 11 years until Hurricane Hermine in September 2016. A total of 68 consecutive hurricanes either missed the state or weakened below hurricane intensity before making landfall in Florida. Furthermore, the state would not experience another major hurricane landfall until Hurricane Irma in September 2017.

See also
 Tropical cyclones in 2005
 List of Category 5 Atlantic hurricanes
 List of Cuba hurricanes
 List of Florida hurricanes (2000–present)
 Timeline of the 2005 Atlantic hurricane season
 Hurricane Allen (1980) – Another record-breaking Category 5 storm that moved through the Caribbean Sea
 Hurricane Gilbert (1988) – A Category 5 storm that previously held the record for the most intense Atlantic storm on record
 Hurricane Mitch (1998) – An extremely deadly Category 5 storm that affected similar areas
 Hurricane Delta (2020) – A Category 4 storm that rapidly intensified in the same area and struck the Yucatán Peninsula
 Hurricane Eta (2020) – A Category 4 hurricane that also rapidly intensified in the same area and devastated Central America

Notes

References

External links

  on Hurricane Wilma.
 The NHC's archive on Hurricane Wilma.
 Storm chaser George Kourounis documents the eye of Hurricane Wilma
 U.S. Rainfall for Hurricane Wilma from HPC
 Wilma pictures, satellites images
 The Disaster Center's Coverage of Hurricane Wilma

 
2005 Atlantic hurricane season
Hurricane Wilma
Hurricane Wilma
Hurricane Wilma
Articles containing video clips
Atlantic hurricanes in Mexico
Category 5 Atlantic hurricanes
Hurricanes in Belize
Hurricanes in Canada
Hurricanes in Cuba
Hurricanes in Honduras
Hurricanes in Jamaica
Hurricanes in Florida
Hurricanes in the Bahamas
Hurricanes in the Cayman Islands
Retired Atlantic hurricanes
October 2005 events in North America
Wilma